Castle is an electoral ward in Colchester and is within the Colchester Borough Council boundary, to which it elects 3 councillors.

The ward covers central Colchester, England including the Town Centre, the historic Dutch Quarter neighbourhood and Colchester Castle, which lends its namesake to the ward.

History
Castle ward has existed since at least 1976 and is still in use today. The boundaries of the ward have seldom changed, with the exception of the amalgamation of the St. Marys neighbourhood (from St. Marys ward) into the west of Castle following boundary changes from the 2002 election.

The ward was originally held by the Labour Party and then changed hands between the Conservatives, Labour and the SDP-Liberal Alliance (later Liberal Democrats) until the 1990 election, when the Liberal Democrats solidly held the ward for the next 25 years. Recently, it has become a marginal ward, last won by the Green Party at the 2019 election.

Castle has the highest vote share for the Green Party in a Colchester ward.

Ward Councillors

Current

Former

Elections

Election Results

Charts

Vote Share: 1976-2000

Vote Share: 2000-2015

Polling districts
Electorate in brackets (as of 2015):

 AF: Castle (1,500)
 AE: Jumbo (1,201)
 AG: Riverside (2,247)
 AH: Cowdray Avenue (2,488)

References

Electoral wards in Colchester